The 1987–88 Calgary Flames season was the eighth National Hockey League season in Calgary and the 16th season in the NHL for the Flames franchise.  The Flames finished atop the Smythe Division standings for the first time in team history, en route to winning their first ever Presidents' Trophy as the top club in the NHL.

The Flames spent almost the entire month of February playing away games as the 1988 Winter Olympics were being held in Calgary at that time.

In the playoffs, the Flames easily defeated the Los Angeles Kings four games to one, setting a franchise record that still stands by scoring 30 goals in a five-game series.  The Flames season was ended by their provincial archrivals, again as the Edmonton Oilers swept Calgary out of the Smythe Division Finals en route to their fourth Stanley Cup in five years.

The Flames set numerous franchise records this season, including most wins (48), most home wins (26), most road wins (22), and most points (105), all of which that were tied or broken in 1988–89.  The Flames 397 goals remains a franchise record, and one of the highest totals in league history. The Flames also finished first in scoring during the regular season. Furthermore, the Flames led the league in short-handed goals scored (23) and power-play percentage (28.46%).

Freshman sniper Joe Nieuwendyk became the second rookie in NHL history to score 50 goals, as his 51 fell just two shy of Mike Bossy's record of 53 set in 1977–78.  Nieuwendyk captured the Calder Memorial Trophy as the NHL's Rookie-of-the-Year for his effort.

Lanny McDonald became the first player to win the King Clancy Memorial Trophy, awarded to players who best exemplify leadership qualities and make notable humanitarian contributions to their community.  In addition, Brad McCrimmon won the Emery Edge Award for leading the league in Plus/Minus at +48.

The Flames sent five players to the 1988 All-Star Game: Al MacInnis, Gary Suter, Brad McCrimmon, Joe Nieuwendyk and Mike Vernon.  Nieuwendyk was also named to the NHL All-Rookie team.

Regular season

Season standings

Schedule and results

Playoffs

Player statistics

Skaters
Note: GP = Games played; G = Goals; A = Assists; Pts = Points; PIM = Penalty minutes

†Denotes player spent time with another team before joining Calgary.  Stats reflect time with the Flames only.
‡Traded mid-season.

Goaltenders
Note: GP = Games played; TOI = Time on ice (minutes); W = Wins; L = Losses; OT = Overtime/shootout losses; GA = Goals against; SO = Shutouts; GAA = Goals against average

†Denotes player spent time with another team before joining Calgary.  Stats reflect time with the Flames only.

Transactions
The Flames were involved in the following transactions during the 1988–89 season.

Trades

Free agents

Draft picks

Calgary's picks at the 1987 NHL Entry Draft, held in Detroit, Michigan.

See also
1987–88 NHL season

References

Player stats: 2006–07 Calgary Flames Media Guide, p. 124.
Game log: 2006–07 Calgary Flames Media Guide, p. 139.
Team standings:  1987–88 NHL standings @hockeydb.com
Trades: Individual player pages at hockeydb.com

Calgary Flames seasons
Presidents' Trophy seasons
Calgary Flames season, 1987-88
Calg
Smythe Division champion seasons